Loche may refer to:

People
 Arthur Loche (mid 20th c.), American college basketball coach
 Salomon Blosset de Loche (c. 1648–1721), Huguenot army officer
 Victor Loche (1806–1863), French soldier and naturalist

Places

Canada
 La Loche River (Ashuapmushuan River), Quebec
 La Loche, a village in northwest Saskatchewan
 La Loche River (Saskatchewan), river in north west Saskatchewan
 Lac La Loche, a lake in northwest Saskatchewan
 Portage La Loche, historic fur-trade canoe portage in northwestern Saskatchewan

France
 Loché, an associated commune of Mâcon

Mexico
 Loché, Yucatán, a village in the Mexican state of Yucatán

See also
 Deloche (disambiguation)
 Loches, a commune in central France
 Loché, an associated commune of Mâcon, France
 Loch (disambiguation)